Brachythemis wilsoni is a species of dragonfly in the family Libellulidae. It is found in Burkina Faso, Cameroon, the Democratic Republic of the Congo, Ivory Coast, Nigeria, Sudan, Togo, Uganda, possibly Botswana, and possibly Kenya. Its natural habitats are dry savanna, moist savanna, subtropical or tropical dry shrubland, subtropical or tropical moist shrubland, rivers, and intermittent rivers.

References

Libellulidae
Insects described in 1952
Taxonomy articles created by Polbot